K. J. Somaiya Institute of Technology (KJSIT) (formerly K. J. Somaiya Institute of Engineering and Information Technology) was established by the Somaiya Trust in the 2001, at Ayurvihar campus, Sion, Mumbai, India. It is an autonomous institute affiliated to the University of Mumbai.

The institute was set up to impart education in the field of Information Technology and allied branches of Engineering and Technology.

The institute is approved by All India Council for Technical Education New Delhi, DTE Mumbai, permanently affiliated to University of Mumbai, and accredited by Tata Consultancy Services and recently (2017) approved by NAAC grade A college list and awarded with best engineering college in 2017-18 by ISTE Maharashtra and Goa. It has a huge campus (85 acres). In December 2018, KJSIEIT was accredited by NBA for UG programs for 3 years.

Departments
The colleges engineering departments are:
Department of Electronics & Telecommunications Engineering
Department of Computer Engineering
Department of Information Technology
Department of Artificial Intelligence and Data Science
Department of Electronics Engineering
Department of Science and Humanities

Campus
The institute is located at Sion, Mumbai. It is part of the 85-acre Somaiya Ayurvihar campus, which also houses the K. J. Somaiya Hospital, Medical College, Cancer Research Centre and K. J. Somaiya College of Physiotherapy. The campus grounds host open cricket and football matches. The campus has one volleyball court, three lawn tennis courts, one rink football, two half-size football grounds,one turf football ground and an open gym. The campus is located off the Eastern Express Highway near Sion.

The college building is an eight-story structure and houses all the departments of the college, as well as a canteen, an auditorium, and separate girls and boys rooms which have a table tennis table for leisure.

Campus activities

Software Development Cell which is actively involved in Research & Development and consultancy projects with industries and academic institutes.
Research Innovation Incubation Design Lab Somaiya Vidyavihar, at Somaiya Campus focuses on technology and startup incubation.
Affiliation to various professional bodies for Student chapters and Faculty chapters

The Institute of Electrical and Electronics Engineers is the world's largest professional association dedicated to advancing technological innovation and excellence for the benefit of humanity. It inspires a global community through IEEE's highly cited publications, conferences, technology standards, and professional and educational activities.

The Institute of Electronics and Telecommunication Engineers is one of the oldest technical bodies in India. It started in 2009 in KJSIEIT.

The students chapter of the Computer Society of India was formed in 2009. Technical and non-technical activities are held throughout the year. The annual technical festival Renaissance is organized jointly by the committee, along with many events through the year.

The Institution of Engineering and Technology is a professional society for the engineering and technology community, with more than 150000 members in 127 countries. It began in 2013.

Entrepreneurship Cell, beginning in March 2009, is an association managed and driven by students to promote entrepreneurship among students. It is associated with the National Entrepreneurship Network to interact with like-minded people. The Cell organises events like E-Week, Campus Company, Techno-preneur workshop and E-Movies.

Active Training and Placement Cell

Student enrichment activities through various student clubs and cells, including:
Robocon Cell
Cyber Security & Research Cell
IOT Cell
Programming Club 
Hobby Club
Street Play Team
Marathi Bhasha Vangmay Mandal, etc.

Interactive/Smart Board learning

Open Gymnasium

Rankings and achievements
Conferred with Autonomous Status by University Grants Commissions' (UGC) Regulation.
Recently Accredited with A Grade by National Assessment & Accreditation Council of India with CGPA of 3.21, in first cycle. 
Winner of Lander Mission Design Contest "Touch the Jovion Moon" conducted by LPSC ISRO as a part of Pearl Jubilee Celebrations.
"Best Engineering College Principal Award 2017" by ISTE Maharashtra & Goa Section in 14thISTE Annual State Convention held at Bharti Vidyapeeth University COE,Pune on 17 February 2017.
KJSIEIT was awarded as best engineering college 2017-18 by ISTE Maharashtra and Goa.
AA+ by Careers360.
KJSIEIT received "An Active Local Chapter Award" by National Program on Technology Enhanced Learning.
Institute has received all over India 3rd Rank in March 2018, 9th Rank in 2017 and 12th Rank in 2015 at National level Robocon Contest,India.
NBA accreditation for UG programs for 3 years.

Placements

To provide appropriate career opportunities to the students, the Training and Placement Cell interacts continuously with different industries and training organizations. Workshops and seminars are organized for academic and overall development of the students.

Leading Recruiters Include:
Avaya Global Connect
Accenture
Computer Sciences Corporation
Patni Compu
NSE IT
VSNL Global
Fortune Infotech
SMG Convonix
Syntel
Mastek
i Flex
Citos
Tata Elxsi
HSBC Global Technology
Tech Mahindra
Infosys
L & T Infotech
ATOS Origin
MU SIGMA
Infosys

Alumni
KJSIEIT Alumni Association comprises students who have completed their final year of the four-year degree course. The Alumni Association is a platform for ex-students with the desire to make contributions to their Alma Mater. The association arranges alumni meets every year in February.

References

Engineering colleges in Mumbai
Affiliates of the University of Mumbai
Educational institutions established in 2001
2001 establishments in Maharashtra